Xilotepelt was a Nicaraguan football team. The team is based in Jinotepe.

History
The team has played in the Primera División de Nicaragua but was relegated following the 2013 Nicaraguan Clausura. In August 2013, the football association decided not to allow Xilotepelt to the second division after a merger with UCEM failed to materialise.

Notable players
Players whose name is listed in bold represented their countries while playing for Xilotepelt
 Milton Busto (2009–2011)
 Emilio Palacios (2008–2012)

Notable coaches

 Martin Mena (2009 – Jun 2010–2011)
 Abel Núñez (July 2010 – Sep 2010)
 Néstor Holwegger (Sep 2010 – Oct 2010)
 Emilio Palacios (Oct 2010 – Dec 2010)
 Miguel Ángel Palacios (Jan 2011–)
 Luis "Guicho" Díaz (2012 – July 2012)
 Martin Mena (July 2012 – December 2012)
 Angel Orellana (Jan 2013 – Feb 2013)

References

External links
https://web.archive.org/web/20090423060711/http://www.xilotepeltfc.webcindario.com:80/
https://web.archive.org/web/20080904062110/http://www.pinolerosports.com:80/futbol/primera-division/xilotepelt-consigue-punto-historico.html

Defunct football clubs in Nicaragua
Association football clubs established in 1996
1996 establishments in Nicaragua